Diaperia prolifera, common name big-head rabbit-tobacco, is a plant species native to the central part of the United States from Montana to New Mexico to Alabama. It prefers dry, open areas.

Diaperia prolifera is an annual herb up to 15 cm (6 inches) tall, grayish green to silvery because of thick woolly pubescence. The stem branches above ground, with leaves up to 15 mm long. Flower heads are usually produced one at a time, but occasionally in groups of 2–3.

Varieties
Two varieties are generally recognized, intergrading in their region of overlap in Texas and Oklahoma:
Diaperia prolifera var. prolifera,  grayish to green - Alabama, Arkansas, Colorado, Kansas, Louisiana, Mississippi, Missouri, Montana, Nebraska, New Mexico, Oklahoma, Texas, South Dakota, Wyoming
Diaperia prolifera var. barnebyi Morefield,  silvery white - New Mexico, Oklahoma, Texas

References

Gnaphalieae
Flora of the United States
Plants described in 1840